iA Writer is a text editor developed by Information Architects (iA), and was initially released on September 22, 2010, for iOS (iPhone and iPad), May 28, 2011, for macOS and 2018 for Microsoft Windows through a Kickstarter campaign.

iA states that the purpose is "to keep you focused on just writing"; it has a typical layout using what the authors call "writing typography" and is characterized by a monospaced and duospaced fonts (based on IBM Plex Mono font), a blue cursor, and a gray background color.

It supports the W3C open standard Micropub for directly publishing to personal websites and microblogging services like micro.blog.

See also
List of text editors
Comparison of text editors

Notes

References

 iA Writer for iPhone review, The Verge
 iA Writer for iPad Review, MacWorld
 , Business Insider

External links
 Official Website

Text editors
MacOS text-related software